Harnai is a village in Dapoli C.D. block, in Ratnagiri district, Maharashtra state in Western India. The 2011 Census of India recorded a total of 7,274 residents in the village.

Climate

Suvarnadurg 

Suvarnadurg is a fort that is located on a small island in the Arabian Sea, near Harnai in Konkan, a rugged section of the coastline along the West Coast of India.

Suvarnadurg fort was built in the 16th century during the rule of emperor Adilshah. In 1660, Shivaji maharaj defeated Adilshah the second and added this fort to the Maratha empire. In the year 1688, after the death of Shivaji Maharaj, Maharaj Rajaram appointed Sarkhel Kanhoji Aangre as the authority over this fort. This fort was a headquarter to the great soldier Kanhoji Aangre who was known as the Shivaji of the sea. From Kanhoji to Tulaji, this fort remained under the command and control of the Aangre family. In the year 1755, this fort came under the rule of the Peshwas and later, under the British in the year 1818. This fort continued to be under the British until Independence. Suvarnadurg fort at Harnai, is the oldest forts in Dapoli.

Goa Fort 

The Harnai port at Dapoli taluka has a group of 3 forts namely, Kanakadurga, Fateh Gadh and Goa Fort. There is no proper information about who built these forts, but it is known for sure that these forts were built to strategically support and protect the main Suvarnadurg fort. Among these 3 forts, the Goa fort spreads in a surface area of three and a quarter hectors. The fort is surrounded by sea on the western and northern sides. The fort has a natural high rise at the southern part. One can find remains of structures on this high rise.

Kanakdurg Fort 

Along with kanakdurg fort, Fattegad & Gova Fort are supporting (strategically) forts to the great marine fort Suvarnadurga at Harnai in Dapoli. Among these sub forts, kanakdurg fort is the closest to Harnai port. kanakdurg fort is surrounded by the sea on all 3 sides and has a surface area of about a quarter hectare. This fort has an oval shape and one can access this fort through a set of stairs. At the end of the stairs, you will find a water tank on the right-hand side at a lower level.

Harnai Fish Market

Fishing is the main source of business of people of Harnai. Followed by Alphonso Mangoes.

One gets to see Auction of fishes in the morning and also in evening from 4:00pm to 7:00pm.

You will get to see variety of fishes include pomfret, kingfish, mackerel, white jumbo prawns, lobster, squids, etc. Caught in the Arabian sea and auction done on Harnai beach.

References

Harnai Beach

Villages in Ratnagiri district